Barleria strigosa is a plant in the family Acanthaceae. It occurs naturally in the foothills of the Himalayas, but has been introduced to far northern Queensland, Australia.

References

strigosa
Flora of Nepal